Bollodingen is a former municipality in the Oberaargau administrative district in the canton of Bern in Switzerland. On 1 January 2011 it was merged with the municipality of Bettenhausen.

History
Bollodingen is first mentioned in 1266 as Bolathingen.

Geography
Of this area,  or 60.2% is used for agricultural purposes, while  or 30.1% is forested. Of the rest of the land,  or 9.2% is settled (buildings or roads),  or 1.0% is either rivers or lakes.

Of the built up area, housing and buildings made up 5.1% and transportation infrastructure made up 4.1%.  30.1% of the total land area is heavily forested.  Of the agricultural land, 41.3% is used for growing crops and 18.4% is pastures.  All the water in the municipality is in rivers and streams.

The municipality is located in the Önz valley.

Demographics
Bollodingen has a population (as of 31 December 2010) of 205.  , 3.0% of the population was made up of foreign nationals.  Over the last 10 years the population has grown at a rate of 3.6%.  Most of the population speaks German  (98.6%), with French being second most common ( 0.9%) and English being third ( 0.5%).

In the 2007 election the most popular party was the SVP which received 52.4% of the vote.  The next three most popular parties were the SPS (18.3%), the FDP (9.2%) and the local small left-wing parties (8.2%).

The age distribution of the population is children and teenagers (0–19 years old) make up 26.4% of the population, while adults (20–64 years old) make up 59.9% and seniors (over 64 years old) make up 13.7%.  The entire Swiss population is generally well educated.  In Bollodingen about 84.6% of the population (between age 25-64) have completed either non-mandatory upper secondary education or additional higher education (either University or a Fachhochschule).

Bollodingen has an unemployment rate of 0.93%.  , there were 18 people employed in the primary economic sector and about 8 businesses involved in this sector.  36 people are employed in the secondary sector and there are 3 businesses in this sector.  5 people are employed in the tertiary sector, with 2 businesses in this sector.
The historical population is given in the following table:

References

External links
 

Former municipalities of the canton of Bern